Songjeong station is a railway station of the Donghae Line in Songjeong-dong, Haeundae District, Busan, South Korea.

History
The station was opened as a former part of Donghae Nambu Line. In 2013, due to the switch to the new line, all services transfer to the new location that opened on December 2, 2013.

Station layout

Gallery

External links

Haeundae District
Korail stations
Railway stations in Busan
Railway stations opened in 1934
1934 establishments in Korea